Ercan Akbay (born 12 February 1959 in Istanbul, Turkey) is a Turkish writer, painter, and musician. After studying finance at university, he has worked in many different sectors in his life; he now devotes his time to writing and painting. He has written two novels and one collection of stories. He also regularly exhibits his paintings and has released two albums of music.

Biography
As a young man, Akbay read widely, admired contemporary Latin and Anglo-Saxon singer-songwriters, and started composing his own poetry accompanied by guitar, which he taught himself to play. He describes his music, painting and writing as an expression of his experiences and his inner life.

He was educated at Kadiköy Maarif College in Istanbul from 1970 to 1978, then the Faculty of Business Administration of Istanbul University from 1978 to 1984. He started work the same day as starting university. After working in the tourism and electronics sectors, he became self-employed, engaged in various different work, including managing a jazz club, starting a number of companies in various fields, and betting on financial markets. He has worked in the stock market, real estate, music and ballet production, old film and record restoration, concert and sound recording and film editing, book cover and poster design, and other fields.

He produced A Summer's Night, a performance of his spoken and sung poetry, in 1989, followed by Tales of the Weird, an experimental album based on his book of the same name, released in 1996.

Towards the end of 1997, he wrote Men Don't Cry. Due to a problem with his publishing house, there was a five-year gap in his writing until 2002. In 2006, he finished his novel What Time is It Mr Wolf?, originally intended as a TV script. In 2007, he reached an agreement to reprint all of his books.

His paintings from after 2006 are exhibited regularly at several art galleries of Istanbul.

Published books
Kuraldışı Öyküler 1997 
Tales of the Weird
Erkekler Ağlamaz 1997 Men Don't Cry– Novel
Tilki tilki saat kaç? 2007 What time is it, Mr. Wolf? – novel
Değirmenlere Karşı 2009 Against Windmills – novel
Ten Kokusu 2011 Scent of Skin – novel
Yol Ayrimlari 2012 Crossroads – novel

Discography
A Summer's Night – 1989 Adventure Records 
Tales of the Weird – 1996 Audeon Music

References 

1959 births
Living people
Artists from Istanbul
Turkish musicians
Turkish painters
Turkish writers